Dario Manca (born 27 November 1966) is an Italian taekwondo practitioner. He competed in the men's finweight at the 1988 Summer Olympics.

References

External links
 

1966 births
Living people
Italian male taekwondo practitioners
Olympic taekwondo practitioners of Italy
Taekwondo practitioners at the 1988 Summer Olympics